Walter Leibundgut (born 12 June 1901, date of death unknown) was a Swiss sprinter. He competed in the men's 4 × 100 metres relay at the 1920 Summer Olympics.

References

1901 births
Year of death missing
Athletes (track and field) at the 1920 Summer Olympics
Swiss male sprinters
Olympic athletes of Switzerland
Place of birth missing